Mahmood Ashraf Usmani (14 May 1951 – 27 February 2022) was a Pakistani Islamic scholar, jurist and an author and headed the Dar-ul-Ifta at Darul Uloom Karachi. He was an alumnus of Jamia Ashrafia and the Islamic University of Madinah. He reportedly issued over a hundred thousand religious edicts and authored about three dozen books on hadith, mysticism, jurisprudence and tafsir.

Biography
Mahmood Ashraf Usmani was born on 14 May 1951 in Lahore into the Usmani family of Deoband. His father Zaki Kaifi was a poet of the Urdu language, and the eldest son of Islamic scholar Muhammad Shafi Deobandi.

Usmani began memorizing the Qur'an with Iftikhar Ahmad Qaiser, and completed memorizing it with Ronaq Ali. He received his early education at home and graduated in the traditional Dars-i Nizami from the Jamia Ashrafia, in Lahore in 1970. He taught at the Ashrfia seminary for two years and moved to study at the University of Madinah. Meanwhile, his father Zaki Kaifi died, and he continued to teach at his alma mater Jamia Ashrafia. From 1990, he joined the Darul Uloom Karachi, where he taught Sahih al-Bukhari and held the post of Mufti.

Usmani died in Karachi on 27 February 2022, at the age of 70. His funeral prayers were offered at 11:30am at Darul Uloom Karachi, and he was buried there. JUI-F chief Maulana Fazl-ur-Rehman contacted Mufti Taqi Usmani and expressed his condolences.

Literary works
Usmani issued over an hundred thousand religious edicts. He authored about three dozen books on Hadith, Sufism, Fiqh and Tafsir.

References

1951 births
2022 deaths
Pakistani Islamic religious leaders
Darul Uloom Karachi people
Jamia Ashrafia alumni
Pakistani writers
Islamic University of Madinah alumni
People from Lahore
People from Karachi
Deobandis
Pakistani Sunni Muslim scholars of Islam
Jurisprudence academics